Sharktopus is a 2010 SyFy original horror/science fiction film produced by Roger Corman, directed by Declan O'Brien, and starring Eric Roberts. It is the first film in the Sharktopus franchise.

Plot
Geneticist Nathan Sands and his daughter Nicole are hired by the U.S. Navy to create a new weapon; they create an intelligent shark that has the tentacles of an octopus, dubbed S-11, controlling the creature using electromagnetic pulses with a device attached to its head. During one of the test missions, S-11 discards the device before traveling to Mexican waters to find food. Sands and his daughter are then assigned to catch S-11 and travel down to Mexico, where they meet up with fishermen Andy Flynn and Santos, who work for Sands to help capture S-11. Andy, Nicole and Santos track S-11 on Andy's boat as Sands and his men follow in a yacht behind them. Several sightings occur as S-11 kills tourists and locals in the area. Fisherman Pez sends a photo of the creature to a news station, and news reporter Stacy Everheart and her cameraman Bones arrive to find the creature, enlisting Pez's help in the process. Stacy researches Sands and deduces that S-11 is a biological experiment. She, Bones and Pez record it killing a few people on a beach before heading into the ocean on Pez's boat to capture more evidence.

Andy and a group of his diver friends go into a cave to find S-11, although the creature attacks them, killing everybody except Andy. He, Nicole and Santos then encounter Stacy, Bones and Pez, although Pez is killed by S-11 before it runs off. Andy, Nicole and Santos pursue it, resulting in Santos being killed. An enraged Andy radios Sands and tells him he's going to kill S-11 despite his orders. Andy and Nicole track S-11 to the mainland, where it kills a few people before Sands and his men arrive and hold Andy hostage. Nicole reprimands her father for wishing to further the experiments, although S-11 arrives and kills Sands's men before Sands himself is killed saving Nicole. Andy and Nicole encounter Stacy and Bones again, who drive them to a resort which S-11 is attacking. Nicole creates a plan to shoot S-11 with a device that will allow her to blow up a computer chip in its brain using her computer. The group arrives at the resort and Bones soon quits as Stacy attempts to put his life in danger to record S-11. However, S-11 then kills them both. Andy manages to shoot S-11 with the device, and Nicole hacks into the chip before overloading it, causing it to explode and kill S-11. Andy and Nicole reunite, and walk off to safety.

Cast
 Eric Roberts as Dr. Nathan Sands
 Sara Malakul Lane as Nicole Sands
 Kerem Bürsin as Andy Flynn
 Héctor Jiménez as "Bones"
 Liv Boughn as Stacy Everheart
 Shandi Finnessey as Stephanie "Stephie"
 Megan Barkley as Lisa
 Peter Nelson as Commander Cox (credited as Calvin Persson)
 Elgar Horowitz as Ellie Loveshaft
 Greg Norte as Gordon
 Roger Corman as Man On Beach (uncredited)
 Ralph Garman as Captain Jack

Reception

On Rotten Tomatoes, Sharktopus has a 57% approval rating, based on reviews from 7 critics.

Kevin Carr of 7M Pictures described it as "cinematic junk food" and gave it 3.5 out of 5. Annalee Newitz of io9 wrote "Sharktopus represents both your guilt, and the assuaging of it, all in one tasty morsel" and called it the Inception of giant monster movies.

Home video
Sharktopus was released to DVD and Blu-ray on March 15, 2011.

A limited edition soundtrack album containing Tom Hiel's musical score to Sharktopus was released by BSX Records in 2012 and is available on CD and digital MP3.

Sequels
A similarly themed movie, Piranhaconda, was released in 2012.

Two official sequels were made: Sharktopus vs. Pteracuda, which was released on August 2, 2014, and Sharktopus vs. Whalewolf, which premiered on July 19, 2015 during Sharknado Week on the SyFy Channel.

See also
 List of killer shark films
 Monster Shark
 Lusca - a sea creature from Caribbean folklore sometimes portrayed as half-shark, half-octopus

References

External links

 
 
 Interview with Tom Heil about scoring Sharktopus at Cinefantastiqueonline

2010 horror films
2010s monster movies
2010s science fiction horror films
2010 television films
2010 films
2010s English-language films
American monster movies
American science fiction horror films
Fictional undersea characters
Films produced by Julie Corman
Films produced by Roger Corman
Films set in California
Films set in Mexico
Films about genetic engineering
Giant monster films
American independent films
Mad scientist films
Films about shark attacks
American natural horror films
Syfy original films
Sharktopus films
Films about sharks
Fictional hybrids
Films directed by Declan O'Brien
2010s American films